Lord Wriothesley Russell MA (11 May 1804 – 6 April 1886) was a Canon of Windsor from 1840–1886

Family 

He was born on 11 May 1804, the fourth son of John Russell, 6th Duke of Bedford, and his wife, the former Georgiana Gordon, daughter of Alexander Gordon, 4th Duke of Gordon.

He married his second cousin, Elizabeth Henrietta Russell (born in 1806). They had three children:
 Alfred John Russell (13 Aug 1833 – 11 Feb 1857)
 Algernon Wriothesley Russell (30 Aug 1835 – 19 Feb 1908)
 Evelyn Mary Eliza Russell (5 May 1837 – 5 Dec 1913)

Career 

He was educated at Trinity College, Cambridge and was awarded MA in 1829.

He was appointed:
 Rector of Streatham, Surrey
 Rector of St Michael's Church, Chenies, Buckinghamshire 1829
 Deputy Clerk of the Closet to Queen Victoria

He was appointed to the ninth stall in St George's Chapel, Windsor Castle in 1840, a position he held until he resigned in 1886.

Rev. Russell and his wife are buried in the churchyard of St Michael's, Chenies, together with other members of the Russell family.

Notes 

1804 births
1886 deaths
Canons of Windsor
Alumni of Trinity College, Cambridge
W
Younger sons of dukes